This is a list of the true bantam breeds of chicken, breeds which are naturally small and do not have a corresponding "full-size" version.

 Barbu d'Anvers (Antwerpse Baardkriel)
 Barbu d'Everberg (Everbergse Baardkriel)
 Barbu d'Uccle (Ukkelse Baardkriel)
 Barbu de Boitsfort (Bosvoordse Baardkriel)
 Barbu de Grubbe (Grubbe Baardkriel)
 Barbu de Watermael (Watermaalse Baardkriel)
 Bassette Liégeoise
 Belgian Bantam (Belgisch Kriel, Naine Belge)
 Bleue de Lasnes
 Booted Bantam
 Burmese
 Dutch Bantam
 Japanese Bantam
 Mericanel della Brianza
 Mugellese
 Naine du Tournaisis
 Nankin Bantam
 Nankin Shamo
 Pekin Bantam
 Pépoi
 Pictave
 Pyncheon
 Rosecomb
 Sebright
 Serama
 Tuzo
 Waasse kriel (Naine de Waes)
 Yakido

References 

True bantam chicken